Langor (Marshallese:) is one of the most populous islands in the Arno Atoll. It is part of the Marshall Islands in the Pacific Ocean.

References

Arno Atoll
Islands of the Marshall Islands